Emiliano Çela (born 21 July 1985 in Memaliaj, Albania) is an Albanian professional football coach and former player, who is the current manager of Kastrioti in the Kategoria Superiore.

Honours
KF Laçi
 Albanian Cup (2): 2012–13, 2014–15

References

External links

Emiliano Çela at FSHF

1985 births
Living people
People from Memaliaj
Association football defenders
Albanian footballers
FK Partizani Tirana players
Flamurtari Vlorë players
KS Egnatia Rrogozhinë players
KS Turbina Cërrik players
KS Shkumbini Peqin players
KF Laçi players
KS Lushnja players
FK Tomori Berat players
KF Apolonia Fier players
KF Korabi Peshkopi players
KS Kastrioti players
KF Besa Kavajë players